The  is a DC electric multiple unit (EMU) commuter train type operated by the private railway operator Tobu Railway in Japan since March 2005, manufactured by Hitachi to its "A-train" concept. The trains represent the first use of aluminium body cars on Tobu commuter trains. They are also the first Tobu trains to feature bilingual (Japanese and English) automated passenger announcements.

Variants
 50000 series: 9 x 10-car sets introduced from March 2005 on the Tobu Tojo Line and from September 2020 on the Tobu Skytree Line inter-running services
 50050 series: 18 x 10-car sets introduced from March 2006 on Tobu Skytree Line inter-running services
 50070 series: 7 x 10-car sets introduced from July 2007 on Tobu Tojo Line inter-running services
 50090 series: 6 x 10-car sets with variable seat configurations introduced from June 2008 on Tobu Tojo Line TJ Liner services

50000 series
The first 50000 series set, 51001, was delivered in November 2004 and entered service on the Tobu Tojo Line on 16 March 2005, followed by second-batch set 51002 in October 2005. The second set differs in having an emergency door in the front ends, and externally resembles the 50050 series used on the Tobu Skytree Line (see below).

Two more sets, 51003 and 51004, were delivered during fiscal 2009. 51003 was delivered to Shinrinkōen Depot in January 2010, followed by 51004 in February 2010. These two sets have pairs of opening windows and interiors based on sets 51061 onward.

Total number of vehicles built: 90

Formation

The 52000, 55000, and 58000 cars each have one single-arm pantograph.

Interior

50050 series

The 10-car 50050 series sets were built for use on the Tobu Isesaki, Skytree and Nikko lines, and inter-running services through the Tokyo Metro Hanzomon Line to the Tokyu Den-en-toshi Line displacing the earlier 30000 series sets.

The first set (51051) entered service on 18 March 2006, and as of January 2007, 10 sets were in service. While broadly based on the Tojo Line 50000 series design with emergency end doors, cars are 30 mm narrower (2,770 mm compared with 2,800 mm) to cope with reduced clearances on the subway lines.

Sets 51061 onward have different seat covers and pairs of opening windows (like the 50090 series) instead of the large single-pane sealed windows on earlier units.

Three more sets (51066 to 51068) were delivered during fiscal 2009.

From October 2012, set 51052 was modified with opening panes in four side windows per car, in the same style as Tojo Line set 51075 and JR East 209 series sets.

Total number of vehicles built: 180

Formation

The 52050, 55050, and 58050 cars each have one single-arm pantograph.

Interior

50070 series

The 10-car 50070 series sets were built for use on Tobu Tojo Line and Tokyo Metro Yūrakuchō Line inter-running services, and also on Tokyo Metro Fukutoshin Line inter-running services from June 2008.

The first set (51071) was delivered in early March 2007, entering revenue-earning service in July. It differs from earlier variants in having full-colour LED destination indicators, and is also equipped with ATO for subway operation.

A total of four sets were delivered by March 2008.

A fifth set, 51075, was delivered in August 2008. This set differs in having opening windows similar in design to those added to JR East 209 series EMUs.

A further two sets, 51076 and 51077, were delivered during fiscal 2011, with 51076 delivered in November 2011, and 51077 in January 2012. These sets differ in having 17" LCD displays above every door, instead of the LED dot-matrix displays used on earlier sets, and also have pairs of opening side windows instead of the large single panes.

Total number of vehicles built: 70

Formation

The 52070, 55070, and 58070 cars each have one single-arm pantograph.

Interior

50090 series

Four 10-car 50090 sets were delivered in February and March 2008 for use on new Tobu Tojo Line limited-stop evening TJ Liner services starting from the start of the new timetable on 14 June 2008. Internally, these trains feature rotating seats that can be arranged longitudinally for daytime services and in forward-facing transverse pairs for "Liner" services. These trains are also used on up "Rapid Express" services in the late afternoon and night as well as the newly introduced Kawagoe Limited Express services from 16 March 2019. Externally, the sets feature a blue waistline stripe running the length of each car, with a "TOJO LINE" logo.

A public preview run of the 50090 series took place on 23 March 2008 from Ikebukuro to Shinrinkōen station, followed by a photographic event at Shinrinkōen depot.

A fifth set, 51095, was delivered from Hitachi in September 2010, followed by 51096 in November 2010, in preparation for an increase in the number of TJ Liner services from the start of the revised timetable on 5 March 2011.

Total number of vehicles built: 60

Formation

The 52090, 55090, and 58090 cars each have one single-arm pantograph.

Interior
The 50090 series sets have seats that can be rotated and configured in longitudinal style for regular daytime services or in forward-facing transverse style for TJ Liner services and late afternoon/evening Ikebukuro-bound Rapid Express services.

Special liveries

"Flying Tojo" livery

From 28 November 2015, 50090 series set 51092, based at Shinrinkoen Depot, received full-body vinyls recreating the dark blue with yellow stripe livery carried by 54 series and 53 series EMUs used on Flying Tojo limited express services on the Tobu Tojo Line during the 1950s. The livery was commemorated with a special run on 2 February 2019, removed soon afterwards, and replaced with the "Ikebukuro - Kawagoe Art Train" livery.

"Ikebukuro - Kawagoe Art Train" livery

Ahead of the 16 March 2019 timetable revision on the Tobu Tojo Line, 50090 series set 51092 was repainted from its previous "Flying Tojo" into a new art-based livery. The livery, designed by Koyano Yuuki, is designed to advertise the city of Kawagoe with the theme of "adding colour to Kawagoe". The set was reintroduced into service on 12 February 2019, and was used on the first down departure of the new "Kawagoe Limited Express" train category operating on the Tojo Line since the 16 March 2019 timetable revision.

Crayon Shin-chan 25th anniversary liveries
From 3 November 2016, 50050 series set 51055 received a yellow vinyl wrapping livery to mark the 25th anniversary of the cartoon character Crayon Shin-chan. This was followed by set 51056 in blue livery from 25 November, set 51057 in red livery from 28 November, set 51058 in orange livery from 12 December, and set 51059 in green livery from 19 December. These sets were originally scheduled to remain in these liveries until May 2017, but the period was extended until late August 2017.

See also
 Seibu 40000 series, a Seibu Railway commuter EMU type that also features rotating longitudinal/transverse seating
 Keio 5000 series, a Keio commuter EMU type that also features rotating longitudinal/transverse seating
 Keikyu 2100 series, a Keikyu commuter EMU type also features transverse seating
 Keikyu N1000 series, another Keikyu commuter EMU type also features rotating transverse seating (batch 20 only)

References

External links

 Tobu 50000 series 

Electric multiple units of Japan
50000 series
Train-related introductions in 2005
Hitachi multiple units
1500 V DC multiple units of Japan